

Gerhard Kauffmann (29 June 1887 – 16 June 1969) was a German general during World War II. He was also a recipient of the Knight's Cross of the Iron Cross of Nazi Germany. Kauffmann was retired from active service on 30 September 1943.

Awards and decorations

 Knight's Cross of the Iron Cross on 9 July 1941 as generalleutnant and commander of 256th Infantry Division

References

Citations

Bibliography

 

1887 births
1969 deaths
People from Mariendorf
Lieutenant generals of the German Army (Wehrmacht)
German Army personnel of World War I
Prussian Army personnel
Recipients of the clasp to the Iron Cross, 1st class
Recipients of the Knight's Cross of the Iron Cross
Reichswehr personnel
Military personnel from Berlin
German Army generals of World War II